Débora Alonso Herrero (3 June 1974) is a former Spanish rhythmic gymnast, world group champion in Athens 1991, in addition to achieving numerous other medals with the Spanish national 

rhythmic gymnastics team. The generation of gymnasts that she joined is known by the pseudonym of the First Golden Girls.

Career 
Alonso started in rhythmic gymnastics at the Club Vallisoletano. In October 1989, she was summoned by Emilia Boneva to enter the Spanish national rhythmic gymnastics team in the group modality, of which she would become a part until 1992. 

During the time in which she was a member of the group, she would train about 8 hours a day at the Moscardó Gymnasium in Madrid under the orders of Emilia Boneva herself and Ana Roncero, who since 1982 had been the national team coaches, and would live with all the members of the team in a house in La Moraleja. She was a substitute gymnast for the team in most of the competitions of that time, although she would start in some exhibitions in Spanish cities during the preseason and in international tournaments such as Karlsruhe.

In 1990 Débora would not travel to any competition, but would remain in Madrid training. Of the four substitutes that she had that year in the group, only two could travel to the competitions. The starting team that year was Beatriz Barral, Lorea Elso, Bito Fuster, Montse Martín, Arancha Marty and Vanesa Muñiz, with Marta Aberturas and Gemma Royo as substitutes. Cristina Chapuli was also part of the team, but like Alonso she was not summoned to the competitions that year.

In 1991, the two groups exercises were the 6 ribbons and the 3 balls + 3 ropes. The first had "Tango Jalousie" as music, composed by Jacob Gade, while the one with balls and ribbons used the song "Campanas", by Víctor Bombi. To choreograph the dance steps of the 6 ribbons exercise, they had the help of Javier Castillo "Poty", then a dancer of the National Ballet, although the team's usual choreographer was the Bulgarian Georgi Neykov. Prior to the World Cup, they won gold at the Karlsruhe tournament (ahead of the USSR and Bulgaria) and 3 bronzes at the Gymnastic Masters in Stuttgart, both in Germany.

On October 12 of that year, the Spanish group won the gold medal in the All-Around of the World Championship in Athens. This triumph was described by the media as historic, since it was the first time that Spain was proclaimed world champion in rhythmic gymnastics. On the first day of the All-Around they had achieved a score of 19,500 in the exercise with 3 balls and 3 ropes, while on the following day, with the staging of 6 ribbons, they obtained a mark of 19,350 (9.90 in composition and 9. 45 running). With a total score of 38,850, the Spanish team finally managed to beat the USSR by 50 thousandths, while North Korea won bronze. The next day, they would also be silver medalists in the two apparatus finals, the 6 ribbon, and the 3 balls and 3 ropes finals, although as in the rest of the competition, Marta would be a substitute gymnast in both exercises. These medals were achieved by Débora together with Lorea Elso, Bito Fuster, Isabel Gómez, Montse Martín and Gemma Royo, in addition to Cristina Chapuli  and  Marta Aberturas as substitutes. These medals would be narrated for Spain by the journalist Paloma del Río through La 2 de TVE. After this achievement, at the end of 1991 they would tour Switzerland.

For 1992, in the Karlsruhe tournament the group won silver, and later they were invited to make an exhibition in the Corbeil-Essonnes tournament. In June 1992, with new exercises they participated in the European Championship in Stuttgart, where they won the gold medal in the general All-Around (shared with Russia), as well as getting another gold in the final of 3 balls and 3 ropes and the bronze with 6 ribbons. The group was made up of Débora, Lorea Elso, Bito Fuster, Isabel Gómez, Montse Martín and Gemma Royo, in addition to the recently incorporated Alicia Martín and Cristina Martínez as substitutes. As groups were not able to participate in the Olympics at that time, she would only participate together with the rest of her companions in the opening ceremony, leading the parade of the participating nations.

Shortly after, they achieved gold in both the Asvo Cup in Austria and in the Alfred Vogel Cup in the Netherlands, where they also won silver with 6 ribbons and gold with 3 balls and 3 ropes. Bito Fuster and Isabel Gómez's injuries caused the team to be reconfigured for the World Championship in Brussels, leaving both as substitutes and being replaced in the title of both exercises by Alicia Martín, Cristina Martínez and Bárbara Plaza, joined Débora, Lorea Elso, Montse Martin and Gemma Royo. In this competition, the group won All-Around silver, staying only one tenth of a point away from being able to revalidate the world title they had won the previous year. In addition, on November 22 they achieved bronze with 6 ribbons and eighth place with 3 balls and 3 ropes. After this Débora retired from competitions, as would the rest of the starting sextet that had been world champion in Athens in 1991.

Subsequently, she has dedicated herself to teaching maintenance gymnastics, aerobics, ballroom dancing and rhythmic gymnastics in the town of Cervera de Pisuerga, where she lives with her family. On December 16, 2017, Aberturas met with other former gymnasts from the national team to pay tribute to the former selector Ana Roncero. On November 16, 2019, on the occasion of the death of Emilia Boneva, some 70 former national gymnasts, including Marta, gathered on the mat to pay tribute to her during Euskalgym. The event took place before 8,500 attendees at the Bilbao Exhibition Center in Baracaldo and was followed by a tribute dinner in her honor.

Legacy and influence 
The national rhythmic gymnastics group of 1991 won the first world title for Spanish rhythmic gymnastics at the World Championships in Athens, achieving for the first time in this discipline a Western country prevailing over Eastern countries. It would also be the first Spanish women's team in proclaim himself world champion in a media sport. Reviews of this milestone appear in books such as Gimnasia rítmica deportiva: aspectos y evolución (1995) by Aurora Fernández del Valle, Enredando en la memoria (2015) by Paloma del Río or Pinceladas de rítmica (2017) by Montse and Manel Martín.

References 

1974 births
Living people
Spanish rhythmic gymnasts
Medalists at the Rhythmic Gymnastics European Championships
Medalists at the Rhythmic Gymnastics World Championships